Lorabela  davisi is a species of sea snail, a marine gastropod mollusk in the family Mangeliidae.

Description
The length of the shell attains 18 mm.

Distribution
This species occurs in the Weddell Sea, Antarctica

References

 Hedley, Charles. Report on Mollusca: From Elevated Marine Beds," raised Beaches," of McMurdo Sound. Expedition, 1916.

External links
  Kantor Y.I., Harasewych M.G. & Puillandre N. (2016). A critical review of Antarctic Conoidea (Neogastropoda). Molluscan Research. 36(3): 153-206
  Tucker, J.K. 2004 Catalog of recent and fossil turrids (Mollusca: Gastropoda). Zootaxa 682:1-1295.
 

davisi
Gastropods described in 1916